The South Atlantic Review is a quarterly peer-reviewed academic journal published by the South Atlantic Modern Language Association. It was established in 1935 and publishes articles and reviews in the fields of language and literature. As of Summer 2014, its editor-in-chief is Barton Palmer.

External links 
 

Publications established in 1935
Linguistics journals
Multilingual journals
Quarterly journals